Phayre is a surname. Notable people with the surname include:

 Arthur Purves Phayre (1812–1885), British Indian Army officer
 Robert Phayre, regicide
 Robert Phayre (British Army officer) (1820–1897)
 Robert Phayre (cricketer) (1901–1993), British soldier and cricketer

See also
 Phayer